Mathias Rusterholz (born 16 August 1971 in Herisau) is a retired Swiss sprinter who specialised in the 400 metres. He represented his country at the 1996 Summer Olympics, as well as three outdoor and one indoor World Championships. In addition, he won the bronze medal at the 1994 European Championships.

With the personal records of 44.99 seconds, he is the standing Swiss record holder.

Competition record

Personal bests
Outdoor
200 metres – 21.00 (-1.0 m/s) (Hochdorf 1995)
400 metres – 44.99 (Lausanne 1996)
Indoor
400 metres – 46.62 (Liévin 1997)

References

1971 births
Living people
Swiss male sprinters
Olympic athletes of Switzerland
Athletes (track and field) at the 1996 Summer Olympics
World Athletics Championships athletes for Switzerland
European Athletics Championships medalists
People from Appenzell Ausserrhoden